Yuanping is a county-level city under the administration of the prefecture-level city of Xinzhou, in north-central Shanxi Province, China.

History
The territory of present-day Yuanping was held by Zhao during the Warring States Period of Chinese history. Under the Qin, it was part of Taiyuan Prefecture. It became  in 114BC under Emperor Wu of the Han. It became  in Jian'an 15 during the Eastern Han. Three years later, its name was restored as Yuanping County but it was moved to Yanmen Commandery.

Geography
Yuanping is located nearly due north of Taiyuan, the provincial capital.

Climate
Yuanping has a monsoon-influenced, continental semi-arid climate (Köppen BSk), with cold and very dry winters, and hot, humid summers. Due to the high elevation and dry climate, the diurnal temperature variation easily exceeds  in winter and spring. With monthly percent possible sunshine ranging from 50% in July to 62% in four months, and the average annual total is 2,585 hours.

Transportation
The city lies on the G55 Erenhot–Guangzhou Expressway. Yuanping is also at the junction of the Beijing–Yuanping Railway and the Datong–Puzhou Railway.

References

www.yuanping.gov.cn 

County-level divisions of Shanxi
Xinzhou